Planogyra is a genus of small air-breathing land snails, terrestrial pulmonate gastropod mollusks in the family Valloniidae.

Species
Species within the genus Planogyra include:
 Planogyra asteriscus (E. S. Morse, 1857)
 Planogyra clappi

References

Further reading 
 

Valloniidae